Judgment of the Storm is a 1924 American silent drama film directed by Del Andrews and starring Lloyd Hughes, Lucille Ricksen, and George Hackathorne.

Plot
As described in a film magazine review, wealthy college student John Trevor loves Mary Heath, who lives on a small, impoverished farm near the college town. Martin Freeland, an adventurous student, also admires her. The burden of supporting the Heath family rests upon Mary's sturdy older brother Dave. The younger, slightly built and much petted brother Bob goes to college. Martin takes Dave on a "sight seeing" tour of the town and John comes along to visit his mother. Dave is killed by accident while visiting a gambling den, which is secretly run by John's mother and is the source of the family's wealth. John is mad with grief and shame, and binds himself out to be a slave on the farm, for life, to atone. No chance is missed to humiliate him. During a storm, John rescues most of the family from otherwise certain death.

Cast

References

Bibliography
 Munden, Kenneth White. The American Film Institute Catalog of Motion Pictures Produced in the United States, Part 1. University of California Press, 1997.

External links
 

1924 films
1924 drama films
1920s English-language films
American silent feature films
Silent American drama films
American black-and-white films
Film Booking Offices of America films
Films directed by Del Andrews
1920s American films